

A 
 Paul Edward Anderson
 Richard G. Austin

B 
 Richard Bachtell
 Wes Barnett
 Bob Bednarski 
 David Mark Berger
 Isaac Berger
 Jacquelynn Berube
 James Bradford (weightlifter)
 Casey Burgener
 Robin Byrd-Goad

C 
 Tommy Calandro
 Mark Cameron
 Dan Cantore 
 Oscar Chaplin III
 Derrick Crass

D 
 John Davis (weightlifter)
 Joseph DePietro
 Gary Deal
 Joseph Dube
 Henry Duey

E 
 Clyde Emrich

F 
 Kendrick Farris
 Sibby Flowers

G 
 Peter George (weightlifter)
 Tom Gough
 John Grimek
 Phil Grippaldi
 Gary Gubner

H 
 Shane Hamman
 Cheryl Haworth
 Cara Heads
 Mark Henry
 Rick Holbrook
 Dane Hussey

I 
 Emerick Ishikawa

J 
 Lee James
 Arlys Johnson-Maxwell

K 
 Mike Karchut
 Peter Kelley
 Russell Knipp
 Tommy Kono
 Stanley Kratkowski
 Frank Kugler

L 
 Fred Lowe

M 
 Albert Manger
 Karyn Marshall
 Mario Martinez (weightlifter)
 Sam Maxwell (weightlifter)
 Tim McRae
 Jeff Michels

N 
 Tara Nott
Maximilian Mormont

O 
 Oscar Osthoff

P 
 Ken Patera
 Joe Puleo

R 
 Joe A. Rector
 Don Reinhoudt
 Louis Riecke
 Melanie Roach

S 
 Harold Sakata
 Cal Schake
 Norbert Schemansky
 Rich Schutz
 David Sheppard (weightlifter)
 Frank Spellman
 Stanley Stanczyk
 Arnie Sundberg
 Arnold Schwarzenegger

T 
 Anthony Terlazzo
 Sam Termine
 John Terry (weightlifter)
 Richard Tom
 Howard Turbyfill

U 
 Roberto Urrutia

V 
 Chad Vaughn
 Charles Vinci

W 
 Curt White
 Bruce Wilhelm
 Frederick Winters

Z 
 Walter Zagurski

 
Weight